David Andrés Henríquez Espinoza (born 12 July 1977) is a Chilean footballer who played as centre back. Henríquez recently played for Primera División club Universidad Católica. He is known for his strength, marking and heading ability.

Club career

Colo-Colo
At the end of 2007, Henríquez contract was not renewed with Chilean Colo-Colo. After the 2007 Clausura championship game, he did not celebrate much with the team as he knew the team was not going to renew his contract. He was injured and could not finish his last game with Colo-Colo.  He left the club as one of the most decorated players in club history and was the team's captain. In the 2006 Clausura Tournament, Henríquez led them to the championship, which was the twenty-fifth in Colo-Colo's storied history. He made his professional debut playing defender for Colo-Colo on 11 February 1995.

International career
Henríquez also made appearances with the Chile national team from 2001 to 2003. He was a member of the national squad competing at the 2000 Summer Olympics in Sydney, which won the bronze medal. Previously, he took part in the Pre-Olympic Tournament.

Outside of football
He was a candidate for the Chamber of Deputies in the 2017 Chilean general election, supported by Progressive Party of Chile.

Honours

Club
Colo-Colo
 Primera División de Chile (8): 1996, 1997–C, 1998, 2002–C, 2006–A, 2006–C, 2007–A, 2007–C
 Copa Chile (1): 1996
 Copa Sudamericana (1): Runner–up 2006

Universidad Católica
 Primera División de Chile (1): 2010
 Copa Chile (1): 2011

International
 Olympic Bronze Medal (1): 2000

References

External links

1977 births
Living people
Footballers from Santiago
Chilean footballers
Chilean expatriate footballers
Chile international footballers
Chile youth international footballers
Footballers at the 2000 Summer Olympics
Olympic footballers of Chile
Olympic bronze medalists for Chile
Chilean Primera División players
Colo-Colo footballers
Club Deportivo Universidad Católica footballers
Primeira Liga players
S.C. Beira-Mar players
Liga MX players
Atlético Morelia players
Ascenso MX players
Dorados de Sinaloa footballers
2001 Copa América players
Expatriate footballers in Portugal
Expatriate footballers in Mexico
Chilean expatriate sportspeople in Portugal
Chilean expatriate sportspeople in Mexico
Olympic medalists in football
Association football defenders
Medalists at the 2000 Summer Olympics
Chilean politicians
Chilean sportsperson-politicians
Politicians from Santiago